Marina Orlova may refer to:

 Marina Orlova (actress) (born 1986), Russian actress
 Marina Orlova (YouTuber) (born 1980), Russian internet celebrity with the show on YouTube, HotForWords

See also
 Orlova (disambiguation)